Antonio Ruiz may refer to:

People
 Antonio Ruíz de Morales y Molina (died 1576), Spanish bishop
 Antonio Ruiz de Montoya (1585–1652), Peruvian Jesuit missionary
 Antonio Ruiz de Montoya University, Peruvian private university named after the missionary
 Antonio Ruíz (painter) (1892–1964), Mexican painter and scenic designer
 Antonio Ruiz (soldier) (died 1824), national hero of Argentina
 Antonio Ruiz (baseball) (born 1911), Cuban professional baseball player
 Antonio Ruiz-Pipò (1934–1997), Spanish composer
 Antonio Ruiz (footballer) (born 1937), retired Spanish football midfielder and manager
 Antoñito Ruiz (born 1951), Spanish actor
 Antonio Ruíz (sprinter) (born 1961), Mexican sprinter
 Antonio Ruiz-Rosales (born 1984), Mexican tennis player

See also
 Antonio (dancer) (1921-1996), Spanish dancer born Antonio Ruiz Soler
 Antonio Hierro (born 1959), Spanish footballer born Antonio Ruiz Hierro